Merten station is a station on the Sieg Railway, situated in Eitorf, Rhein-Sieg-Kreis in the German state of North Rhine-Westphalia. The station was opened between 1897 and 1905 on a section of the Sieg Railway, opened by the Cologne-Minden Railway Company (CME) between Hennef (Sieg) and Eitorf on 1 August 1860. It has two platform tracks and is classified by Deutsche Bahn as a category 6 station.

The station is served by S-Bahn S 12 services from Köln-Ehrenfeld (Horrem in the peak) to Au (Sieg) and S19 services on weekdays from Düren to Herchen or Au (Sieg). The S12 services operate hourly, but the S19 services are less frequent.

Notes

Railway stations in North Rhine-Westphalia
Rhine-Ruhr S-Bahn stations
S12 (Rhine-Ruhr S-Bahn)
Buildings and structures in Rhein-Sieg-Kreis